I fichissimi (Italian for "The really cool guys", also known as Guys and Dolls in the Suburbs) is a 1981 Italian comedy film directed by Carlo Vanzina. The film consists in a story of rival punks in Milan and it is loosely based on the William Shakespeare's tragedy Romeo and Juliet.

Plot    
Milan, early 1980s. The Milanese Romeo and the Apulian Felice lead two rival gangs. Romeo falls in love with Giulietta without knowing she is the sister of Felice.

Cast 

 Jerry Calà as Romeo
 Diego Abatantuono as Felice
 Simona Mariani as Giulietta
 Mauro Di Francesco as Renato 
 Carmine Faraco as Felice's Brother 
 Ugo Bologna as Lawyer Colombo

See also    
 List of Italian films of 1981

References

External links

1981 films
Italian comedy films
1981 comedy films
Films directed by Carlo Vanzina
Films scored by Detto Mariano
Films based on Romeo and Juliet
Films set in Milan
1980s Italian-language films
1980s Italian films